Aspinet may refer to:

 Aspinet (Nauset), sagamore of the Nauset who died in 1623
 , United States Navy tug and freight lighter renamed USS Aspinet (YF-176) in 1918